This is a list of serving senior officers of the Royal Navy. It includes currently serving admirals, vice-admirals, rear-admirals, and commodores.

Admirals

Vice-Admirals

Rear-Admirals

Commodores

Acting

Surgeon-Commodores

Royal Fleet Auxiliary

See also
 List of serving senior officers of the Royal Marines
 List of serving senior officers of the British Army
 List of serving senior officers of the Royal Air Force

 List of Royal Navy admirals (1707–current)
 List of Royal Navy vice admirals
 List of Royal Navy rear admirals

References

Admirals of the Royal Navy
Lists of Royal Navy personnel
Royal Navy